Prince Andrei Alexandrovich of Russia ( – 8 May 1981) was the first son and second child of Grand Duke Alexander Mikhailovich of Russia and Grand Duchess Xenia Alexandrovna of Russia. He was also the eldest nephew of Nicholas II of Russia, the last Tsar.

Born and raised in Imperial Russia during the reign of his uncle Nicholas II, his military career in the Russian navy and the Chevalier guards was cut short by the Russian Revolution. He escaped the fate of many of his relatives killed by the Bolsheviks, fleeing to his parents' estate in Crimea. For a time, he was under house arrest there with a large group of family members. He married there.

In December 1918, he left Russia with his wife and his father. They lived for a couple of years in Paris, France, which had a large population of Russian refugees. Eventually he settled in England in the household of his mother. His wife died during World War II, a victim of the London Blitz. He remarried in 1942. He moved to Provender House in Faversham, Kent, which was owned by the family of his second wife. Alexandrovich lived quietly there as an English country squire until his death. His son, Prince Andrew Andreevich, was claimant to the headship of the Romanov Family until his death in 2021.

Early life

Prince Andrei Alexandrovich was born at the Winter Palace, Saint Petersburg, the second child and first son of Grand Duke Alexander Mikhailovich and Grand Duchess Xenia Alexandrovna of Russia. Although an Imperial Romanov Family Dynast and a grandson of Emperor Alexander III through his mother, he did not receive the title Grand Duke of Russia because he was a great-grandson of Emperor Nicholas I in the male line through his father. Due to the insistence of his grandmother, the Dowager Empress Maria Feodorovna, he was honoured with a 21 gun salute at birth (which was usually reserved for Grand Dukes), although he was only a Prince of Russia (to be honoured with a 15-gun salute).

In his youth, before World War I, Prince Andrei toured Europe with his parents. At Biarritz, he joined his great uncle King Edward VII of the United Kingdom at the Palace Hotel. Prince Andrei joined the Russian navy and served under his father Grand Duke Alexander Mikhailovich of Russia. Later he became lieutenant in the Chevalier guards, whose colonel-in-chief was his uncle, Emperor Nicholas II. Just before the Russian revolution, he was the only member of his family to accompany the Empress Alexandra and her four daughters on their last visit to the churches of Novgorod. It was the last time he saw them.

Revolution

At the fall of the Russian monarchy with the February Revolution in 1917, Prince Andrei moved with his siblings and their parents to his father's property in Crimea, Ai-Todor. A large group of members of the Romanov family gathered there, trying to escape the disturbances in the rest of the country. At first they lived undisturbed while the Russian Provisional Government was in power.

It was during this turbulent period that Prince Andrei began a relationship with Elisabetta Ruffo-Sasso (1886–1940) dei duchi di Sasso-Ruffo dei principi di Sant' Antimo, a young divorcée. They had met in St Petersburg in 1916. She was a daughter of Fabrizio Ruffo, Duke of Sasso-Ruffo, and Princess Natalia Alexandrovna Mescherskaya (a descendant of a famous family of the Stroganovs), and distantly related to the Romanovs. Elisabetta had a daughter, (Elisabeth Alexandrovna Friederici), from her first marriage to Major General Alexander Alexandrovitch Friederici (1878–1916) (they had married in 1907). Elisabetta, from the noble house of Ruffo di Calabria, was a cousin of Queen Paola of Belgium. 

After Elisabetta became pregnant, the couple married on 12 June 1918 in the family chapel at Ai-Todor in the presence of his family, including his grandmother the Dowager Empress. Prince Andrei was twenty-one years old and his grandmother had thought him too young for marriage, but his parents, Grand Duchess Xenia and Grand Duke Alexander, gave their permission. During this time they could not contact Prince Andrei's uncle, the last reigning Emperor, Nicholas II of Russia, who was being held in captivity in internal exile. A month later, Nicholas II was killed with his wife and children while they were held captive in Yekaterinburg on 16/17 July 1918. In later life Prince Andrei rarely spoke of them, as he found the memories too painful.

The situation of the Romanovs in Crimea deteriorated after the successful Bolshevik coup of November 1917. For a time Prince Andrei was imprisoned along with his parents, grandmother the Dowager Empress, and a large number of other Romanov relatives, at Dulber, a palace in Crimea that belonged to Grand Duke Peter Nikolaevich of Russia. In 1918 Russia and Germany were still at war. When German troops invaded the peninsula, they liberated the Romanovs in captivity. In December 1918, Prince Andrei left Russia with his wife, who was pregnant with their first child, and his father, Grand Duke Alexander Mikhailovich aboard the Royal Navy ship HMS Marlborough in order to attend the Paris Peace Conference. He and his father were seeking support in western Europe for the White Army.

Exile
Prince Andrei spent the first couple of years in exile in France. For a time he lived in the French Riviera in a property that belonged to his aunt Grand Duchess Anastasia Mikhailovna of Russia. The two eldest children of Prince Andrei and his wife, who was called Elsa within the family, were born in France and the youngest one in London: 
Princess Xenia Andreevna (1919–2000) m. 1 1945 to Calhoun Ancrum (1915–1990); they divorced in 1954. m. 2 1958 Geoffrey Tooth (1908–1998). She had no children from either marriage.
Prince Michael Andreevich (1920–2008) m. 1 1953 Jill Murphy (1921–2006); they divorced in 1953. m. 2 1954 Shirley Cramond (1916–1983). m. 3 1993 Giulia Crespi (b. 1930). Michael had no children from any of his marriages.
Prince Andrew Andreevich (1923–2021) m. 1 1951 Elena Dournovo (1927—1992). They had one son before divorcing in 1959. m. 2 1961 Kathleen Norris (1935–1967). They had two children. m. 3 1987 Inez Storer (born 1933). From 31 December 2016 to 28 November 2021, most of Emperor Nicholas I's descendants recognized him as head of the Romanov Family.

Short of money and without a steady occupation, Prince Andrei eventually settled permanently in England at Frogmore, where his mother Grand Duchess Xenia had a grace-and-favour residence named Wilderness House. They later moved to Hampton Court. They were living there during World War II when Elisabetta, already near death from cancer, died following an air raid in October 1940. One bomb hit very close to their house, causing a ceiling beam to fall onto Elisabetta. She died shortly thereafter.

Two years later, while staying in Balmoral, Prince Andrei met his second wife Nadine McDougall (1908–2000). She was the eldest of three daughters of Lieutenant Colonel Herbert McDougall and his Finnish wife Sylvia Borgström. They became engaged on 18 June 1942 and married at Norton, Kent  church, near Provender on 21 September 1942. The Archbishop of Canterbury, William Temple, officiated the Anglican service. The Russian Orthodox wedding was presided by Archimandrite Nicholas who, as Sydney Gibbes, had been tutor of the children of Tsar Nicholas II.

Prince Andrei had one daughter from his second marriage:
Princess Olga Andreevna (b. 1950) m. 1975 Thomas Mathew (b. 1945). They had four children.

In 1949, Prince Andrei moved into Provender House in Faversham, Kent, which was owned by the family of his second wife. The house was noted as having been a hunting lodge of Edward, the Black Prince. 
Provender was the prince's only real home in exile.

He spent his time gardening, entertaining, and cooking, which he had learnt from the French chefs in his parents' palaces. He was an artist and had several exhibitions of his works in Paris before World War II. He designed the cover of Let's Light the Candles, a memoir by his mother-in-law. Over the years he came to enjoy his role as an English country squire, opening church fetes and sporting charitable causes, particularly in the village where he lived.

He had some outside interests as well. After the death of his mother Grand Duchess Xenia, he inherited her position as President of the Legat Ballet. His nephew, the Marquess of Milford Haven, appointed him as president of the Chaine des Rotisseurs for London and the Home Counties.
Prince Andrei was the protector of the Sovereign Order of the Orthodox Knights Hospitaller of St. John of Jerusalem.

Prince Andrei Alexandrovich lived quietly until his death at home in Faversham on 8 May 1981, aged 84. He was buried in the church at Norton. His widow died in 2000.

Ancestry

Notes

References

Princess Olga Romanoff. My father and his family. Royalty Digest Quarterly. 2007 N 1.
Van Der Kiste, John & Hall, Coryne. Once a Grand Duchess: Xenia, Sister of Nicholas II. Sutton Publishing, 2002. .
Willis, Daniel. The Romanovs in the 21st Century: a genealogical Biography. VDM, 2009. .

1897 births
1981 deaths
Princes of royal blood (Russia)
People from Faversham
Royalty from Saint Petersburg
19th-century people from the Russian Empire
Emigrants from the Russian Empire to France
Emigrants from the Russian Empire to the United Kingdom
Russian anti-communists